Lieutenant-General Sir William Raine Marshall  (29 October 1865 – 29 May 1939) was a British Army officer who in November 1917 succeeded Sir Frederick Stanley Maude (upon the latter's death from cholera) as Commander-in-Chief of the British forces in Mesopotamia. He kept that position until the end of the First World War.

Biography
Marshall was born in the village of Stranton, near Hartlepool, County Durham. He was the younger son of a solicitor, William Marshall, and his wife, Elizabeth Raine.

He first went to Repton School and then Royal Military College, Sandhurst. He received a commission into the Sherwood Foresters in 1886, after which he served on the Malakand expedition, on the North West Frontier and on the Tirah expedition before fighting in the Second Boer War. Following the end of the war, in late May 1902, Marshall received a brevet promotion to lieutenant-colonel in the South African Honours list published on 26 June 1902.

Commanding Officer of 1st Battalion Sherwood Foresters on the Western Front during 1914–15, Marshall was then posted to command 87th brigade of 29th Division in the ill-fated expedition to Gallipoli, during which he received a promotion to Major-General in June 1915.

A series of divisional commands followed: 42nd, 29th, and 53rd, before he was posted to Salonika with 27th Division, and then with III (Indian) Corps on the Mesopotamian Front. It was while commanding III Corps that Marshall participated in the capture of Kut-al-Amara in February 1917, and in the capture of Baghdad the following month.

With Sir Frederick Maude's death as Commander-in-Chief from cholera (most probably from contaminated milk), the hugely popular commander was replaced by the careful and meticulous Marshall, appointed by Sir William Robertson at the War Office in London, the latter determined to scale back operations in Mesopotamia.

It was in this capacity that Marshall accepted the surrender of the Ottoman army at Mosul on 30 October 1918, with the signing of the Armistice of Mudros.

His decision to seize Ottoman territory around Mosul after the ceasefire is controversial, the Official History makes no mention of this action and is explained in a 2017 article.

His post-war career took him back to India commanding the Southern Army and remaining there until 1923; he retired the following year.

Marshall was appointed a Companion of the Order of the Bath in 1916. He was knighted three times – as a Knight Commander of the Order of the Bath (1917), Knight Commander of the Order of the Star of India (1918) and Knight Grand Cross of the Order of St Michael and St George (1919)

He died at Le Grand Hôtel, Bagnoles-de-l'Orne, France. He was survived by his wife, Emma Cundell, whom he married in 1902.

References

Further reading
 Marshall, Lieutenant General Sir William, Memories of Four Fronts.  London: Ernest Benn Ltd, 1929.

|-
 

1865 births
1939 deaths
British Army lieutenant generals
Military personnel from County Durham
People educated at Repton School
Graduates of the Royal Military College, Sandhurst
British military personnel of the Tirah campaign
British Army personnel of the Second Boer War
Sherwood Foresters officers
British Army generals of World War I
Knights Grand Cross of the Order of St Michael and St George
Knights Commander of the Order of the Bath
Knights Commander of the Order of the Star of India
People from Hartlepool